Free Radical Design Ltd. is a British video game developer based in Nottingham. Founded by David Doak, Steve Ellis, Karl Hilton and Graeme Norgate in Stoke-on-Trent in April 1999, they are best known for their TimeSplitters series of games. After going into financial administration, it was announced on 3 February 2009 that the studio had been acquired by German video game developer Crytek and would be renamed Crytek UK. Crytek had a good relationship with the city of Nottingham due in part to its sponsorship of the Gamecity festival and its recruitment drives with Nottingham Trent University. In 2014, the studio would close and a majority of the staff transferred to the newly formed Dambuster Studios. In May 2021, the original founders reformed the studio, led by Doak and Ellis, to create a new entry in the TimeSplitters series. The current studio incarnation operates under Deep Silver.

History 
Most of Free Radical Design's initial employees previously worked for the game developer Rare. While at Rare, they (David Doak, Steve Ellis, Karl Hilton, Graeme Norgate, Lee Ray and James Cunliffe) worked on the Nintendo 64 first-person shooters GoldenEye 007 and Perfect Dark. From late 1998 to early 1999, this team left Rare to form Free Radical Design, which was established in April 1999, their first release being TimeSplitters for the PlayStation 2 in 2000. It was known for its very fast-paced gameplay and its particular emphasis on multiplayer rather than story. TimeSplitters attracted attention at the time because of the former Rare employees' work on the critically acclaimed GoldenEye 007. Its sequel, TimeSplitters 2, became the highest-ranked first-person shooter for PlayStation 2 on GameRankings.

Free Radical Design was working on Star Wars: Battlefront III from 2006 to 2008, but it was cancelled by their publishing partner when it was supposedly "99 percent" complete. The cancellation of this title, and the poorly received release of Haze, contributed to Free Radical Design going into bankruptcy. In late 2008, Free Radical Design was approached by Activision to work on a GoldenEye 007 remake. Although the studio rebuilt the Dam Level for the PlayStation 3 and Xbox 360, negotiations fell through, with the studio entering administration soon afterwards.  The remake would release on those consoles without FRD's involvement in 2011 as an enhanced port of its original release on the Wii and Nintendo DS a year prior.

On 18 December 2008, it was reported that the studio had shut down, though it was later confirmed that the company had gone bankrupt, leaving only 40 of the original 185 staff still employed. On 3 February 2009, Haze scriptwriter Rob Yescombe announced that Free Radical Design had been purchased by German game developer Crytek. In 2010, the company moved from Sandiacre to brand-new offices in the new central Nottingham Southreef development. The £50 million investment will allow Crytek UK to "grow over the next few months".

Financial difficulties and closure 
In June 2014, reports surfaced that Crytek had missed wage payments and withheld bonuses for the company's employees, and that as a result, a number of employees had filed grievances and refused to report to work, and at least 30 employees had left the company since 2011 alone due to a decreasing morale at the studio. After denying that there were issues, Crytek later admitted on 25 July 2014 that the company was in a "transitional phase" as it secured capital for future projects, with a particular emphasis on online gaming.

On 30 July 2014, Crytek announced that, due to an internal restructuring, it would sell the intellectual property of Homefront (the sequel for which, later restructured as the reboot Homefront: The Revolution, was in development at Crytek UK at the time) to Koch Media, parent company of video game publisher Deep Silver, and lay off much of the company's staff. Crytek left it unclear whether the company had been shut down entirely, however all staff were transferred to the new Dambuster Studios being established in Nottingham in accordance with British law, where they afterwards continued to work on Homefront: The Revolution.

Reformation 
In May 2021, Embracer Group announced during their 2020–2021 full-year report that Free Radical Design would be reformed as a subsidiary of Deep Silver with the intent of bringing "the much-loved TimeSplitters IP back to life". Key original members of the original Free Radical Design are involved in the reformation including founders Steve Ellis and David Doak. Their studio is based in Nottingham.

Games developed

As Free Radical Design (1999–2008)

As Crytek UK (2009–2014)

As Free Radical Design (2021–present)

Cancelled games 
 Star Wars: Battlefront III
 TimeSplitters 4

References

External links 
 
 
 

 
Deep Silver
Crytek
Companies based in Nottingham
British companies established in 1999
British companies disestablished in 2014
British companies established in 2021
Video game companies established in 1999
Video game companies disestablished in 2014
Video game companies established in 2021
Video game companies of the United Kingdom
Video game development companies
1999 establishments in England
2014 disestablishments in England
2021 establishments in England
British subsidiaries of foreign companies
Re-established companies